The name "allistatin" sometimes refers to two compounds: allistatin I and II.  Studies have established that compounds in garlic, possibly including allistatin I and allistatin II, contain sulfur and may have biological effects.

References

Garlic
Organosulfur compounds